Christ Church, Graveyard and Sexton's House is an historic Episcopal church complex located at Worton, Kent County, Maryland. The church, also known as Christ Church IU, is a small brick structure, basilican in plan, with a narrower sanctuary appended.  It was built in 1765 (more likely 1845–1870) to serve as the parish church of Chester Parish which had been established that same year. It is a well-proportioned example of a small Gothic Revival structure interpreted in brick.  The Sexton's house dates from the period of the earlier church and consists of two adjoining sections, one brick and one stone, both one story high with dormers.

It was listed on the National Register of Historic Places in 1980.

In 1835, the church sold part of its lands adjacent to the highway to the town's United Methodist church for its graveyard.

See also
 List of post 1692 Anglican parishes in the Province of Maryland

References

External links
, including photo from 1968, at Maryland Historical Trust
Christ Church IU Parish website

Episcopal church buildings in Maryland
Anglican parishes in the Province of Maryland
Churches in Kent County, Maryland
Churches on the National Register of Historic Places in Maryland
Gothic Revival church buildings in Maryland
18th-century Episcopal church buildings
National Register of Historic Places in Kent County, Maryland